West Branch Sacandaga River is a river in Hamilton County in the state of New York. It begins northwest of Benson and flows west then northward then eastward before converging with the Sacandaga River south of Wells.

Recreation

In May 2021, the New York State Department of Environmental Conservation stocked 133  brown trout and 1200  rainbow trout into the river in the town of Wells.

Tributaries 

Right

Silver Lake Outlet
North Branch
Chub Lake
Trout Lake
Cow Creek
Moose Creek
Ninemile Creek
Devorse Creek
Vly Creek

Left

Whitman Flow
Good Luck Lake
State Brook
Shanty Brook
Teeter Creek
Piseco Outlet
Cold Brook
Hamilton Lake Stream
Dugway Creek
Jimmy Creek

References 

Rivers of Hamilton County, New York
Rivers of New York (state)
Tributaries of the Sacandaga River